Spinacaropus is a genus of mites in the family Acaridae.

Species
 Spinacaropus brasiliensis Fain & A. M. Camerik, 1978

References

Acaridae